Teresa Forn Munné (born 1959) from Barcelona is a Catalan long-distance runner. She was champion of the Skyrunner World Series in 2003.

External links 
 Further results

References

Living people
1959 births
Spanish female long-distance runners
Spanish sky runners